Stempfferia ciconia, the stork epitola, is a butterfly in the family Lycaenidae. It is found in Sierra Leone, Ivory Coast, Ghana, Cameroon, the Democratic Republic of the Congo and Uganda. The habitat consists of forests.

Subspecies
Stempfferia ciconia ciconia (Sierra Leone, Ivory Coast, Ghana)
Stempfferia ciconia camerunica Libert, 1999 (Cameroon)
Stempfferia ciconia mongiro (Jackson, 1968) (eastern Democratic Republic of the Congo, Uganda)

References

Butterflies described in 1892
Poritiinae
Butterflies of Africa